Hous may be:
 a Middle English spelling of House
 an ISO 4 abbreviation of Housing
 the plural of Hou

See also 
 Hose (disambiguation)
 Haus (disambiguation)